The Center for Earth and Planetary Studies (CEPS) is a research center affiliated with the Smithsonian Institution. Based in Washington, DC, the Center, which was founded in 1972, conducts scientific research related to planetary science, geophysics and the biophysical environment. As a Regional Planetary Image Facility, the Center hosts NASA data including images and maps of the planets and their satellites. It also houses images taken by the Space Shuttle. These data collections are accessible to outside researchers. The Center, which is located at the National Air and Space Museum, curates two of its galleries, Exploring the Planets and Looking at Earth, as well as contributing elsewhere in the museum.

Research
Among other research, the Center is studying the tectonic history of the planet Mercury, developing geologic maps of Venus, researching geomorphology on Earth, studying geological processes on the icy moons of the giant planets, and exploring terrain formation on Mars.

External links
Official Site
Exploring the Planets
Looking at Earth

1972 establishments in the United States
NASA groups, organizations, and centers
Smithsonian Institution research programs
Research institutes in Washington, D.C.